William Evelyn Osborn (1868–1906) was a British artist.

The Tate Gallery has two of its works in its permanent collection: Beach at Dusk, St Ives Harbour
c.1895, and Royal Avenue, Chelsea c.1900.

References

1868 births
1906 deaths
British artists